Tom Martin Biseth (born 29 March 1946) is a Norwegian former professional racing cyclist. He won the Norwegian National Road Race Championship in 1970 and 1974.

References

External links

1946 births
Living people
Norwegian male cyclists
Sportspeople from Tønsberg